Riposte is the third album by Slovenly, released on 1987 through SST Records.

Track listing

Personnel 
Vic Abascal – production
Steve Anderson – vocals
Rob Holtzman – drums
Lynn Johnston – bass clarinet, saxophone, viola
Tim Plowman – bass guitar, guitar
Tom Watson – guitar, bass guitar
Scott Ziegler – guitar, bass guitar

References

External links 
 

1987 albums
Slovenly (band) albums
SST Records albums